Lord Ruthven is a fictional character. First appearing in print in 1819, in John William Polidori's "The Vampyre", he was one of the first vampires in English literature. The name Ruthven was taken from Lady Caroline Lamb's Glenarvon, where it was used as an unflattering parody of Lord Byron, while the character was based on Augustus Darvell from Byron's "Fragment of a Novel". "The Vampyre" was written privately, and published without Polidori's consent, with revisions to the story made by Polidori for an unpublished second edition showing that he planned to change the name from Ruthven to Strongmore. The initial popularity of "The Vampyre" led to the character appearing in many translations and adaptations, including plays and operas, and Ruthven has continued to appear in modern works.

Origins

There is a genuine title of Lord Ruthven of Freeland in the Peerage of Scotland which is a subsidiary title of the Earl of Carlisle in the United Kingdom. The fictional characters are not related to the historical title holders.

The name Ruthven was used for the title character in the 1816 Gothic novel Glenarvon by Lady Caroline Lamb. This character was based on the genuine Lord Byron and was not a vampire. Lady Caroline was a former lover of Lord Byron's and the novel did not offer a flattering portrait.

The character of Lord Ruthven in John William Polidori's "The Vampyre" was based on Augustus Darvell in Byron's "Fragment of a Novel".

In a copy of "The Vampyre" annotated by Polidori—presumably for a revised second edition of the book which was never published—the author changed the name of the vampire from "Lord Ruthven" to "Lord Strongmore".

"The Vampyre"

Lord Ruthven appeared as the title character in the 1819 short story "The Vampyre". This had been written in 1816 by Dr. John William Polidori, the traveling doctor of Lord Byron. It was published in the April 1, 1819 edition of The New Monthly Magazine. The publishers falsely attributed the authorship to Byron. Both Byron and Polidori disputed this attribution.

In the story, Aubrey meets the mysterious Lord Ruthven at a social event when he comes to London. After briefly getting to know Ruthven, Aubrey agrees to go travelling around Europe with him, but leaves him shortly after they reach Rome when he learns that Ruthven seduced the daughter of a mutual acquaintance. Alone, he travels to Greece where he falls in love with an innkeeper's daughter, Ianthe. She tells him about the legends of the vampire, which are very popular in the area. However, the romance is short lived as she is unfortunately killed, found with her throat torn open. The whole town believes it to be the work of the evil vampire. Aubrey does not make the connection that this coincidentally happens shortly after Lord Ruthven comes to the area. Aubrey makes up with him and rejoins him in his travels, which becomes his undoing. The pair are attacked by bandits on the road and Ruthven is mortally wounded. On his death bed, Ruthven makes Aubrey swear an oath that he will not speak of Ruthven or his death for a year and a day, and once Aubrey agrees, Lord Ruthven literally dies laughing.

Aubrey returns to London and is amazed when Ruthven appears shortly thereafter, alive and well and living under a new identity. Ruthven reminds Aubrey of his oath and then begins to seduce Aubrey's sister. Helpless to protect his sister, Aubrey has a nervous breakdown. Upon recovering, Aubrey learns that Ruthven is engaged to his sister, and they are due to be married on the day his oath will end. He writes a letter to his sister explaining everything in case something happens to him before he can warn her in person. Aubrey does in fact die, and his letter is destroyed by his physician, thinking it the ravings of a mad man. Ruthven marries Aubrey's sister, and kills her on their wedding night, found drained of blood with Ruthven long gone into the night.

His character is one typical of the gothic genre and vampires in general. His vampire character is alluring and sexual, but is also linked with horror and supernatural terror.

Subsequent appearances
The story was an immediate success and several other authors quickly adapted the character of Lord Ruthven into other works. Cyprien Bérard wrote an 1820 novel, which was falsely attributed to Charles Nodier. Nodier himself wrote an 1820 play, which was adapted back into English for the London stage by James Robinson Planché as The Vampire, or The Bride of the Isles. At least four other stage versions of the story also appeared in 1820.

In 1828, Heinrich August Marschner and W. A. Wohlbrück adapted the story into a German opera, . A second German opera with the same title was written in 1828 by Peter Josef von Lindpaintner and Cäsar Max Heigel, but the vampire in Lindpaintner's opera was named Aubri, not Ruthven. Dion Boucicault revived the character in his 1852 play The Vampire: A Phantasm, and played the title role during its long run. Alexandre Dumas, père also used the character in an 1852 play.

A Lord Ruthven also exists in Tom Holland's novel, Lord of the Dead. Lord Ruthven is actually Lord Byron.

A Lord Ruthven also appeared in the Swedish novel  (1848), the first published work by author and poet Viktor Rydberg; as the story unfolds, it becomes clear that he is inspired by him in name only. This Ruthven is not a supernatural being, but a lunatic believing himself to be a vampire.

In The Count of Monte Cristo, the main character Edmond Dantès is often referred to as Lord Ruthven by a countess. The countess incorrectly attributes the creation of Ruthven to Byron.

Lord Ruthven appears as a main character in Nancy Garden's young adult book Prisoner of Vampires. In this story, Ruthven uses the name "Radu" and is a relation and helper of both Count Dracula and Carmilla.

Lord Ruthven served as the inspiration for a 1945 film, The Vampire's Ghost, which was adapted into comic book format in 1973. Lord Ruthven also appears in the background of the Vampire: The Masquerade game system, under the name Lambach Ruthven.

Kim Newman uses the character of Lord Ruthven in his alternate history Anno Dracula series, having Ruthven serve as the Conservative Prime Minister after Count Dracula seizes the English throne. Ruthven holds the Premiership from  until 1940, when he loses it to Winston Churchill. Ruthven later reclaims it following the war, losing it to Churchill again after the Suez Crisis. Ruthven later serves as Home Secretary under Margaret Thatcher and is poised to take over as Prime Minister again following her departure.

Ruthven also appeared in some Superman comics, notably in Superman: The Man of Steel #14 and #42 and Superman #70. He has also appeared in Marvel Comics. Originally, he appeared in the first issue of Vampire Tales, then as the possessor of the mystical book called Darkhold. An incidental character called Ruthven appears in later issues of Neil Gaiman's The Sandman comic; this Ruthven is a man with a rabbit's head, as well as prominent "vampire" fangs.

A comical "Sir Ruthven Murgatroyd" is the main character of Gilbert and Sullivan's Ruddigore. In it, the pastoral Robin Oakapple finds that he is descended from an evil uncle and is forced to take up his ancestor's evil ways.

Ruthven and Sir Francis Varney are two of the main characters in Vivian Shaw's Strange Practice (2017) and its sequels. In this series, Ruthven's full name is Edmund Ruthven.

Ruthven appears in Perry Lake's The Legend of Dracula series, where he is named Francis Ruthven.

A human Lord Ruthven appears in the BBC television series Dracula (2020).

The Lord Ruthven Award by the Lord Ruthven Assembly is named after the character.

References

External links
 Lord Ruthven books

Fictional vampires
Literary characters introduced in 1816
Fictional prime ministers of the United Kingdom
Characters in British novels of the 19th century
Male literary villains
Fictional lords and ladies